Johann Friedrich Matthäi (3 March 1777, Meissen - 23 October 1845, Vienna) was a German portrait and history painter.

Life and work 
He was the son of Johann Gottlob Matthäi (1753-1832), a Meissen porcelain manufacturer, who later became an architect and sculptor. He initially studied at the Dresden Academy of Fine Arts with Giovanni Battista Casanova. This was followed by studies at the Academy of Fine Arts in Vienna with Heinrich Friedrich Füger.

After study trips and stays in Florence (1802–1804), and Rome (1805–1807), he became a teacher at the Dresden Academy and, in 1810, was named its Director. In 1823, he was appointed Inspector (curator) for the  Gemäldegalerie Alte Meister; becoming its Director in 1834. He was one of the last exponents of pure Classicism in Germany. He died in Vienna, while returning from a trip to Italy. In Dresden

He was a longtime member of the Dresden Freemasons lodge, "Zum goldenen Apfel" (The Golden Apple). His students at the Academy included the Nazareners Carl Eggers and Johannes Veit.

References

Further reading 
 
 "Matthäi, Friedrich". In: Hans Vollmer (Ed.): Allgemeines Lexikon der Bildenden Künstler von der Antike bis zur Gegenwart, Vol. 24: Mandere–Möhl. E. A. Seemann, Leipzig 1930, p. 260

External links 

1777 births
1845 deaths
18th-century German painters
18th-century German male artists
German portrait painters
German history painters
Academic staff of the Dresden Academy of Fine Arts
People from Meissen
19th-century German painters
19th-century German male artists